Acquaviva may refer to:

Places

Italy 
Acquaviva, Montepulciano, in the province of Siena
Acquaviva Collecroce, in the province of Campobasso
Acquaviva delle Fonti, in the province of Bari
Acquaviva d'Isernia, in the province of Isernia
Acquaviva Picena, in the province of Ascoli Piceno
Acquaviva Platani, in the province of Caltanissetta

San Marino 
Acquaviva (San Marino), a sanmarinese castello

People
House of Acquaviva, an Italian noble family, descendants of Giulio Antonio Acquaviva
Andrea Matteo Acquaviva (1456–1528), Duca d'Atri, Italian writer
Belisario Acquaviva (c. 1460–1528), his younger brother
Claudio Acquaviva (1543–1615), fifth general of the Society of Jesus
Giulio Antonio Acquaviva (c. 1420–1481), Italian nobleman and condottiere
Jean-Félix Acquaviva (born 1973), French politician
John Acquaviva (born 1963), Canadian DJ
Nick Acquaviva (1927–2003), American composer and band leader
Rodolfo Acquaviva (1550–1583), Jesuit missionary and martyr in India
Tony Acquaviva (1925–1986), American composer and conductor
Viviana Acquaviva (born 1979), Italian astrophysicist

See also
 Aquaviva (disambiguation)